Johannes "Jannie" Mouton (born 1946) is a South African billionaire businessman, the founder and chairman of PSG Group.

Early life
Mouton was born in Carnarvon in 1946, and grew up there. He has a bachelor's degree from Stellenbosch University.

Career
Mouton started his career aged 22 as an articled clerk at PwC. He qualified as a chartered accountant in 1973. In 1995, Mouton was fired as managing partner by stockbrokers Senekal, Mouton & Kitshoff, a firm he co-founded. He later founded PSG Group.

Personal life
His first wife, Dana Mouton died in 2004. His second wife is Deidré. Mouton has two sons, Jan and Piet, and a daughter, Charité. He lives in Stellenbosch, South Africa. His son Piet is the CEO of PSG Group. His eldest son Jan manages the PSG Flexible Fund and is a non-executive director of PSG. Mouton's longstanding friendship with the lately controversial businessman Markus Jooste is advertised on the Sauvignon Blanc wine that they produced together. Jooste facilitated Steinhoff's 20% investment in PSG which assisted Mouton in warding off a hostile bid from ABSA bank.

Works
And then they fired me (autobiography)

References

1946 births
Living people
Stellenbosch University alumni
South African billionaires
South African businesspeople